P&M Hi-Tech City Centre Mall in the city of Jamshedpur, Jharkhand, is the one of the largest shopping malls in eastern India. Film director Prakash Jha & R.K.Aggarwal are the builders of the mall. It is located at Outer Circle Road, Bistupur.

Shops and retail

Gallery

See also 

 List of tourist attractions in Jamshedpur

References

Jamshedpur
East Singhbhum district